Tarishing is a village with around 200 inhabitants and a subdivision of the Astore District of Gilgit−Baltistan, Pakistan. It is considered to be the gateway to Nanga Parbat, the ninth-highest mountain on Earth. The village has around 25 shops, one boys' high school, one girls' middle school, one private English-medium school, two hotels and a small medical centre (a 10-bed hospital is under construction). A large glacier beside the Rupal River is also a part of this village, which is situated on an altitude of about 2900 meters.

Climate
In summer (May–October), the village has a warm but moderate climate, although nights are cold the entire year-round.

Languages
The predominant languages spoken amongst the native population of this village are Shina and Urdu.

Tourism

Because of bad weather and unavailability of basis needs, you should not trust any medical facility available in this town. Before you plan to visit Astore Valley, make all necessary arrangements and get enough information about these areas either from tourism companies or trusted porters.

To get to Tarishing, you have to hire a jeep from Astore, a trip which will take about 1.5 hours, or you can go there using local transport buses. There are buses from Gilgit, Manshera and other cities to Astore.

References

Populated places in Astore District